The men's 400 metre freestyle competition of the swimming events at the 1971 Pan American Games took place on 8 August. The last Pan American Games champion was Greg Charlton of US.

This race consisted of eight lengths of the pool, with all eight being in the freestyle stroke.

Results
All times are in minutes and seconds.

Heats

Final 
The final was held on August 8.

References

Swimming at the 1971 Pan American Games